Alutaceodontia is a genus of fungi belonging to the family Schizoporaceae.

The genus has almost cosmopolitan distribution.

Species:

Alutaceodontia alutacea

References

Hymenochaetales
Agaricomycetes genera